Conrad of Saxony, also called Conradus Saxo, Conrad of Brunswick or Conradus Holyinger, was a Friar Minor and ascetical writer.

Biography
Date and place of birth uncertain. Holyinger is perhaps his family name. The error has been made by some of confounding Conrad of Saxony with another person of the same name who suffered for the Faith in 1284, whereas it is certain that they were two distinct individuals, though belonging to the same province of the order in Germany.

Conrad became provincial minister of the province of Saxony in 1245, and for sixteen years ruled the province with much zeal and prudence. While on his way to the general chapter of 1279, he was attacked with a grievous illness and died at Bologna in 1279.

Works
The writings of Conrad of Saxony include several sermons and the "Speculum Beatæ Mariæ Virginis"; the latter, at times erroneously attributed to St. Bonaventure, was edited by the Friars Minor at Quaracchi in 1904. The preface to this excellent edition of the "Speculum" contains a brief sketch of the life of Conrad of Saxony and a critical estimate of his other writings.

Sources
 Catholic Encyclopedia article

External links
 Speculum Beatae Mariae Virginis (Latin, 1904 edition)

1279 deaths
German Friars Minor
Year of birth unknown
German male writers
13th-century German Catholic theologians